The Dial-Goza House (also known as the William H. Dial House) is a historic U.S. house in Madison, Florida. It is located at 105 Northeast Marion Street. On July 24, 1973, it was added to the U.S. National Register of Historic Places.

References

Gallery

Houses on the National Register of Historic Places in Florida
Houses in Madison County, Florida
National Register of Historic Places in Madison County, Florida